The 2010 United Kingdom local elections were held on Thursday 6 May 2010, concurrently with the 2010 general election. Direct elections were held to all 32 London boroughs, all 36 metropolitan boroughs, 76 second-tier district authorities, 20 unitary authorities and various Mayoral posts, all in England. For those authorities elected "all out" these were the first elections since 2006. The results provided some comfort to the Labour Party, losing the general election on the same day, as it was the first time Conservative councillor numbers declined since 1996.

Summary of results

Source:

London boroughs

All seats in the 32 London Boroughs were up for election.

Metropolitan boroughs

One third of the seats in all 36 Metropolitan Boroughs were up for election.

Unitary authorities
One third of the council seats were up for election in 20 unitary authorities.

The elections in Stoke-on-Trent had originally been cancelled following a referendum result which decided to abolish the existing Mayor and Cabinet system of governance, with replacement elections to take place in 2011 following a review of the council by the Boundary Committee for England. However, it was later decided to hold elections to one-third of the council in 2010 as planned.

Non-metropolitan districts

The elections that were due to be held in Exeter and Norwich were cancelled due to structural changes. Following the 2010 general election, the structural changes were cancelled, leading to elections in both cities in September 2010 (see 2010 Exeter City Council election and 2010 Norwich City Council election).

Half of council
Seven district councils had half of their seats up for election.

Third of council
69 district councils had one third of their seats up for election.

Mayoral elections
There were four mayoral elections.

References

 
2010
May 2010 events in the United Kingdom